Royal Far West is an Australian charity based in Manly, New South Wales, that connects Australian country children to the developmental care they need. Founded in 1924 by Methodist missionary Reverend Stanley Drummond from Cobar, today Royal Far West works in partnership with families, schools, healthcare providers, local government and community groups, offering health, education and disability services for country children and their families at its Centre for Country Kids in Manly, as well as virtually via Telecare and in local rural and remote communities. The charity's mission is to improve the health and wellbeing of children and young people who live in rural and remote communities. Royal Far West's Centre for Country Kids opened in December 2018. This purpose-built, state-of-the-art facility integrates specialist paediatric services with the Royal Far West Department of Education School, enabling the charity to support and strengthen the resilience and wellbeing of children and families in Australia's rural communities.

Royal Far West's Patron is the Governor of New South Wales, General The Honourable Margaret Beazley AC QC.

History 
The first Far West camp was organised in 1925, taking 58 children and six mothers from towns including Bourke, Brewarrina and Wilcannia to Cronulla. The following year the camp was held at Manly for the first time In Manly, the operator of a local cottage hospital, Dr George Moncrieff Barron, volunteered his services free of charge, and would continue to do so until his death. Land would later be purchased in Wentworth Street, allowing the Drummond Far West Children's Home to be built. The original facility provided 80 beds.

An idea conceived by a doctor from the remote NSW town of Trangie was adopted by Far West in 1931 which saw it operating mobile baby clinics staffed by nurses out of converted railway carriages along railway lines in the west of the state. By 1954, four carriages had been converted and were the only of their type in the world. The Far West Scheme also developed an aerial transport service in the 1930s and successfully lobbied the New South Wales Government to pay for the construction of airstrips to allow better access to communities. Stanley Drummond met Nancy Bird Walton in 1935 and soon hired her to provide the air ambulance service on behalf of the scheme. Walton used her own aircraft, and later was appointed Officer Order of the British Empire in honour of her dedication to this service in 1966. The prefix Royal was granted by Queen Elizabeth II in 1970.

Reverend Stanley Drummond died in 1943 and was succeeded by his brother, Norman Drummond, as chairman, and he remained in the role until his death in 1983.

NSW Department of Education Royal Far West School 
A public school was established at the children's home in Manly in 1938, catering to children who required extended stays for ongoing treatment. The school is equipped to work with students from preschool to year 12, many of whom require a high level of support and assistance for behavioural and learning difficulties. Siblings of client children also attend the school while staying at Manly. The school also participates reading and literacy programs across the state. A world first, in December 2018 the school moved into the brand new Centre for Country Kids, integrating the school with the charity's specialist paediatric services.

Core Programs

Telecare for Kids 
This award-winning program connects country children with specialist assessment, therapy and local capacity-building via videolink from their schools, homes and clinics. Telecare for Kids is growing rapidly, expanding into more schools and homes, with an increased emphasis on building the capacity of parents, teachers and early educators.

Paediatric Developmental Program (PDP) 
The PDP is a benevolent multidisciplinary health service for children with complex developmental concerns and their families from rural and remote NSW who cannot access the local services they need. The PDP is a specialist service with expertise in supporting complex families, providing trauma-informed care and family-centred practice. This program is a partnership between NSW Health and Royal Far West.

Windmill 
Windmill is Royal Far West's disability service dedicated to children aged 2–12 from rural and remote communities. In addition to intensive early intervention therapy blocks provided in Manly, the program uses Telecare to reach children in their homes and schools.

Healthy Kids Bus Stop 
A collaboration with Ronald McDonald House Charities, Local Health Districts and schools, the Healthy Kids Bus Stop provides a unique developmental screening service to children aged 3 to 5 years across rural and remote NSW, enabling early identification of issues and a pathway to care so they can start school ready to learn.

References

1924 establishments in Australia
Health charities in Australia
Organisations based in Australia with royal patronage
Medical and health organisations based in New South Wales